Abdullah Sediqi (born 25 December 1996) is a Taekwondo athlete from Afghanistan.

Personal life 
Sediqi lives in Antwerp, Belgium. He fled Afghanistan in 2017 following death threats.

Career 
He won silver at the 2019 Spanish Open and bronze at the 2020 Dutch Open, in addition to representing World Taekwondo as a refugee athlete at the 2019 World Championships in Manchester. 

He was included as one of 29 members of the IOC Refugee Olympic Team to compete at compete at the 2020 Summer Games with his participation in the 68kg Taekwondo.

References

1996 births
Living people
Taekwondo practitioners at the 2020 Summer Olympics
Afghan male taekwondo practitioners
Afghan refugees
Refugee Olympic Team at the 2020 Summer Olympics